Downend may refer to:
Places in England
 Downend, Berkshire, a village 
 Downend, Isle of Wight
 Downend, South Gloucestershire, a suburb of Bristol
 Downend air crash
Downend, a hamlet in the parish of Horsley, Gloucestershire
Downend, a hamlet in the civil parish of Puriton in Somerset
Downend Castle
People
Richard Downend (born 1945), English cricketer and rugby union player